Over 1,600 entries have been submitted into the Eurovision Song Contest since it began in 1956, comprising songs and artists which have represented fifty-two countries. The contest, organised by the European Broadcasting Union (EBU), is held annually between members of the union, with participating broadcasters from different countries submitting songs to the event and casting votes to determine the most popular in the competition. From an original seven participating countries in the first edition, around forty entries are now regularly submitted into the competition every year.

Principally open to active member broadcasters of the EBU, eligibility to participate in the contest is not determined by geographic inclusion within the traditional boundaries of Europe. Several countries from outside of Europe have previously submitted entries into the contest, including countries in Western Asia and North Africa, as well as transcontinental countries with only part of their territory in Europe. Australia, a country in Oceania, made its first contest appearance in  when SBS, an EBU associate member broadcaster from the country, received an invitation to submit an entry to mark the contest's 60th anniversary.

Each year a date is typically set by which time broadcasters may announce to the EBU their intent to participate in the contest, which can be revoked condition-free up to this deadline date. However on several occasions over its history, entries which had been submitted into the contest by the participating broadcasters following the cut-off date, or which were planned to be submitted, have subsequently not gone ahead. This can occur for varying reasons, including disqualification for breaking the rules of the contest or through withdrawal by the broadcasters themselves. On a number of occasions participation has also been suggested or attempted in countries which are precluded from entering the contest, due to a lack of EBU member broadcaster or for other reasons.

In addition to its five contest wins, the  has also placed second sixteen timesmore than any other countryand also holds the record for the most consecutive contest appearances, competing in every edition since 1959. Although it has also achieved three contest wins,  holds the record for the most last-place finishes in contest history, having featured at the bottom of the scoreboard eleven times .

Entries 
The following tables list the entries which have been performed at the contest since the introduction of semi-finals in 2004. Entries are listed by order of their first performance in the contest; entry numbers provide a cumulative total of all songs performed at the contest throughout its history, and a second cumulative total outlines the total entries for each country. For each individual year placings for each entry in that year's final are shown, with placings in the contest's semi-final(s) shown in brackets. Songs which were performed multiple times are shown only once in each table, with separate columns showing the running order for each entry in that year's semi-final(s) and final.

Only songs which have competed in the contest final or in the semi-finals are considered contest entries. Submitted entries for the ultimately cancelled  are also excluded from this list for the purposes of calculating cumulative totals for entry numbers and country totals.

In line with the official Eurovision Song Contest records, the 1992 entry which represented the Federal Republic of Yugoslavia, subsequently renamed Serbia and Montenegro in 2003, is considered to have represented Yugoslavia rather than Serbia and Montenegro; Serbia and Montenegro is therefore considered to have made its first appearance in 2004.

Table key
  WinnerWinning entries in each edition of the contest
  Second placeEntries which came second in each edition of the contest
  Third placeEntries which came third in each edition of the contest
  Last placeEntries which came last in each edition of the contest
  Semi-final qualifierEntries which qualified for the final by placing within the top 10 in each edition's semi-final(s)
  Back-up jury selectionEntries which qualified for the final as the back-up juries' highest-placed country which had failed to place in the top 9 countries (2008–2009)
  Did not qualifyEntries which did not qualify for the final
  Did not performEntries which were not performed in the respective show, due to automatic qualifier status or a non-qualifying semi-finalist
  Semi-final 1Entries which were performed in the first semi-final of that year's contest (2008–present)
  Semi-final 2Entries which were performed in the second semi-final of that year's contest (2008–present)

1956–2003

2000s

2010s

2020s

Withdrawn and disqualified entries 
On a number of occasions entries into the contest have been prevented from competing at a late stage, either through withdrawal by the participating broadcaster, or through disqualification or exclusion by the European Broadcasting Union. The list below highlights cases where an entry for a given country had been planned in a particular year but which ultimately did not occur, either by withdrawal, disqualification, exclusion or the cancellation of the contest.

On a number of occasions participation in the contest has been either suggested or attempted by countries which are ineligible due to a lack of a participating EBU member broadcaster, such as past media reports of interest by broadcasters in China, Kosovo, Liechtenstein and Qatar. Participation has also been suggested for a number of nations and territories whose participation is currently covered by another country. Potential entries from Wales and Scotland (currently countries of the United Kingdom) and the Faroe Islands (currently a territory of Denmark) have been reported, but are generally prevented due to the exclusive participation rights of the sovereign nation to which they belong. Wales and Scotland have participated in other Eurovision events where the United Kingdom as a whole do not participate, including the Junior Eurovision Song Contest and Eurovision Choir.

Eurovision Song Contest 2020 

The Eurovision Song Contest 2020 was planned to be the 65th edition of the contest, however the contest was cancelled in March 2020 due to the COVID-19 pandemic. A statement released by the EBU following the cancellation confirmed that the entries chosen to compete in the 2020 contest would not be eligible to compete in 2021. As these songs were not performed live in the competition, they are not counted in the running total of entries performed.

See also 
 List of countries in the Eurovision Song Contest
 List of Junior Eurovision Song Contest entries

Notes

References

Further reading

External links 
 
 Diggiloo Thrush
 4Lyrics

entries (2004-present)
Lists of songs
Lists of singers